Kells Priory is one of the largest medieval monuments in Ireland. The Augustine priory is situated alongside King's River beside the village of Kells in the townland of Rathduff (Madden), about 15 km south of the medieval city of Kilkenny. The priory is a National Monument and is in the guardianship of the Office of Public Works. These give the priory the appearance more of a fortress than of a place of worship and from them comes its local name of "Seven Castles".

4 km southeast of the priory on the R697 regional road is Kilree round tower and 9th century High Cross, said to be the burial place of Niall Caille. It was used in the film Barry Lyndon as the location for the English Redcoat encampment.

History
Kells Priory was founded by Geoffrey FitzRobert in 1193. FitzRobert was brother-in-law to Strongbow and the priory succeeded an earlier church that was dedicated to St. Mary, the Blessed Virgin and served as the parish church to nearby Kells village.

During its first century and a half, the priory was attacked and burned on three occasions, firstly by Lord William de Bermingham in 1252, by the Scots army of Edward Bruce on Palm Sunday 1326, and by a second William de Bermingham in 1327. It seems likely then that the walls and fortifications date back to this period of unrest.

In 1324 the Bishop of Ossory, Richard de Ledrede, paid a lenten visit to the priory. Following an inquisition into a Kilkenny sect of heretics, Alice Kyteler and William Outlawe were ordered to appear before the Bishop to answer charges of witchcraft. Outlaw was supported by Arnold de Paor, Lord of Kells who arrested the Bishop and had him imprisoned in Kilkenny Castle for 17 days. This caused great scandal and on his release, the Bishop successfully prosecuted the heretics. Alice Kyteler fled to England and remained there, Alice Smith also fled, but her maidservant Petronilla de Meath became Ireland's first heretic to be burned at the stake.

Dissolution of Kells Priory finally took place in March 1540 and the church and property were surrendered to James Butler, 9th Earl of Ormonde.

Layout 
The priory is divided into two parts, an inner monastic precinct alongside the river and a large outer enclosure to the south. In the fifteenth century, the latter was referred to as Villa Prioris but in more recent times it has been known as Burgher's Court, the Burgess or Burgess Court. Burgess Court is adopted here because it reflects the purpose for which it was constructed. In the past, Burgess Court was thought to have been the site of the medieval borough of Kell but modern research has shown that this was not the case. Today, all the monastic remains are grouped together in the precinct, while Burgess Court is little more than a walled field.

Excavations 
Tom Fanning, a state archaeologist and subsequently senior archaeology lecturer in NUI Galway began an excavation of the site in 1972. His work was completed by Miriam Clyne after Fanning's death in 1993.

There were approximately 20,000 archaeological finds which range from pieces of carved stone, pottery including Ham Green, floor and ridge tiles, metal objects as well as a collection of painted window glass which has allowed the reconstruction of what some of the window patterns may have looked like. The original priory church was a simple cruciform building, but, over time, was extended in several directions, including the fifteenth-century second enclosure.

Burials
Patrick Barrett

See also
 List of abbeys and priories in Ireland (County Kilkenny)

References

Further reading

External links 

A site by Daniel Tietzsch-Tyler with photos and plans.
http://www.roundtowers.org/kilree/index.htm – Kilree Round Tower and High Cross

Christian monasteries in the Republic of Ireland
Archaeological sites in County Kilkenny
Buildings and structures in County Kilkenny
Religion in County Kilkenny
Ruins in the Republic of Ireland
Former populated places in Ireland
National Monuments in County Kilkenny